Mank (Original Music Score) is the score album for David Fincher's 2020 film of the same name, composed by Trent Reznor and Atticus Ross. It was released by The Null Corporation label on December 4, 2020, coinciding with the worldwide release on Netflix. The film marks Fincher's fourth collaboration with Reznor and Ross after the Academy Award-winning score for The Social Network (2010), The Girl with the Dragon Tattoo (2011) and Gone Girl (2014). Both Reznor and Ross used period-authentic instrumentation from the 1930s and 40s, instead of their synth-heavy style. The orchestral sections were performed by each members at their homes, due to the COVID-19 pandemic lockdown.

The score album featured 52-tracks with a duration of one-and-a-half hours, upon the initial release. In addition, an extended soundtrack consisting of 87 tracks with a duration of three-hours, was released to the public on December 11 (a week after the film and soundtrack release), through Reznor and Ross' blog on the online music distributor Bandcamp. The extended play itself featured 35 tracks which consisted of unreleased music and demos, that were not featured in the film. A vinyl edition of the soundtrack is scheduled to release later, that will not contain any track from the extended play.

The score received positive response from critics and listeners, appreciating Reznor and Ross, for the period setting and instrumentation saying that "it takes back to the 1930s" Following the reception, the film score received nominations from several award ceremonies, including Golden Globe, Academy and BAFTA. The duo, however, won the awards at the major ceremonies for their compositions in Soul.

Development 
Fincher's frequent collaborators Trent Reznor and Atticus Ross composed the score for Mank, whom confirmed their association in December 2019. Fincher did not have any pre-conceived musical approach while writing the script, but the team decided for a period-setting score reflecting Bernard Herrmann's composition for Citizen Kane (1941). Thus, Reznor and Ross used period-authentic instrumentation from the 1930s and 1940s, instead of their synth-heavy style, to accompany the film. The duo stated that "[Ross and I] were intimidated, as usual, but I think any good project starts with a level of discomfort [...] we were looking for something that's interesting and would feel, if it was in 1940, would be an experimental approach to how it would sound." They called scoring a period film was "challenging" as the score was highly unconventional, calling it as "a pre-modern story in postmodern clothes".

The musical palette ranges from big-band arrangements and percussive, jazz, orchestral pieces, strings and other period instruments to imitate Herrmann's style for Citizen Kane. In an interview with The New-York Magazine, Fincher stated that "The music has been recorded with older microphones, so it has a sort of sizzle and wheeze around the edges — you get it from strings, but you mostly get it from brass. What you're hearing is a revival house — an old theatre playing a movie."

As a result of the COVID-19 pandemic, each member of the orchestra recorded their sections for the score from home. Ross said that "When those sessions were presented to us, and we hit the spacebar, and we just heard the raw piece play, it sounded incredible. I thought I couldn’t believe it". The first listen of the soundtrack was released on Reznor's private website on October 21, 2020. This featured over official stills and more than 200 behind-the-scenes footage regarding the making of the film. The soundtrack list was also released on the website on that date. While releasing the additional compositions, the band Nine Inch Nails had stated that "These are additional and alternate compositions that didn’t get used in the film along with a selection of Trent and Atticus demos pre-orchestration".

Track listing

Reception 
Allie Gemmill of Collider said that: "The rich, warm, brassy sounds that score the story as we follow Mankiewicz through a decade's worth of professional and personal highs, lows, and revelations only enriches the viewing experience". Critic Jonathan Broxton stated: "The score works in the film and succeeds admirably as a standalone experience [...] It’s compositionally interesting and intellectually stimulating, dramatically apt, thoroughly enjoyable from a purely musical point of view, and shows a rich new side to their musical personality that continues to evolve over time." Firstpost-based critic Lakshmi Govindarajan Javeri called the score album as "one of the refreshing soundtrack of the lockdown year", further adding that "Reznor and Ross have captured an entire bygone era in 52 tracks and have certainly left us with the impression of having lived at the time". Indulge-based Benjamin Milton said "The soundtrack is perfect, at times it even sounds like it may have been written and recorded in the nineteen-thirties." Filmtracks.com wrote "The quality of the score simply cannot support either length of time, but not because of the big band and foxtrot portions. Sprinkled extensively into the first two-thirds of the score and featuring the straight big band performances far more often, these passages are quite admirable in their variety and authenticity. If assembled into their own lengthy suite of cues, they'd be a compelling tribute to the style of the era."

Chart performance

Accolades

Notes

References 

2020 soundtrack albums
Ambient soundtracks
Experimental music soundtracks
Jazz soundtracks
Orchestral music
Albums produced by Atticus Ross
Albums produced by Trent Reznor
Albums free for download by copyright owner
Trent Reznor soundtracks
Atticus Ross soundtracks
The Null Corporation soundtracks